Opus was a pop-rock group from Graz, Austria. Formed in 1973, the group remained active until 2021, when they retired. The band is mainly known for its 1985 single release, "Live Is Life", which reached the Top 10 in several European countries.

History
In 1985, Opus released "Live Is Life", which topped the charts in many countries; it was a #1 hit in Canada for seven weeks in late 1985 and early 1986. A live recording of the song made the Top 40 in the US in 1986. It reached #6 in the UK Singles Chart on 3 August 1985, and stayed in the charts for 15 weeks.

Another standout track from Opus was the power ballad "Flyin' High" a live version of which appeared both on the Live is life album, and on their successful US release, Up and Down. At a concert in the mid-1980s, fellow Austrian rock star Falco joined Opus on stage for a rendition of "Flyin' High."

Opus remains active, "Live is Life" remaining its pinnacle release to date. The band also has had success with other songs in Austria, Germany and Switzerland.

In popular culture
Cover versions of this song have also been performed by Stargo, Laibach, the Hungarian band Tormentor, the Estonian band Kuldne Trio ("Laip on Laip"), Axxis and Dolapdere Big Gang. Additionally, as a guest, DJ Ötzi released a version with the Hermes House Band in 2002, which reached #50 in the UK chart.

The band can be seen performing the song in front of celebrating Austrian government officials during the COVID-19 lockdowns on 24 November 2021.

Band members

Current members
 Herwig Rüdisser – vocals
 Ewald Pfleger – guitar, backing vocals
 Kurt-Rene Plisnier – keyboard
 Günter Grasmuck – drums, percussion
 Juice WRLD - vocals

Timeline

Discography

Studio albums
 Daydreams (1980)
 Eleven (1981)
 The Opusition (1982)
 Up and Down (1984)
 Solo (1985)
 Opus (1987)
 Magical Touch (1990)
 Walkin' on Air (1992)
 Love, God & Radio (1996)
 The Beat Goes On (2004)
 Opus Magnum (2020)

Live albums
 Live Is Life (1984)
 Jubileé (1993)
 Tonight at the Opera (2009)
 Graz Liebenau (2013)

Compilation albums
 Best of (1985)
 Greatest Hits – The Power of Live Is Life (1998) 
 Flyin' Higher – Greatest Hits (2003)
 Back to Future – The Ultimate Best-Of (2008)

Singles (selection)

References

External links

The Official Opus Homepage

Austrian pop rock music groups
English-language singers from Austria
Musical groups established in 1973